Harry Simms may refer to:

Harry Simms (cricketer) (1888–1942), English cricket player
Harry Simms (labor leader) (1911–1932), American labor movement leader

See also
Henry Simms (1717–1747), thief and highwayman